The Jordan River Diversion Tunnel - a relic of the Victorian gold rush -  is on the Jordan River near the locality of Jericho, about 7 km south of Woods Point in Gippsland, Victoria, Australia.  The tunnel is about 30 m long x 4 m high x 3 m wide, cut through rock.  The river still runs through it. 

No record has been found of the tunnel's construction and use. It has been alternatively attributed to either river-bed sluicers during the earliest mining period at Jericho (1861-5) or to an attempt in 1872 to hasten floodwaters away from the township.

The site is listed in the Victorian Heritage Inventory.

References

Victoria (Australia) gold rush river diversions
Tunnels in Victoria (Australia)